17th meridian may refer to:

17th meridian east, a line of longitude east of the Greenwich Meridian
17th meridian west, a line of longitude west of the Greenwich Meridian